Quixadá Futebol Clube, commonly known as Quixadá, is a Brazilian football club based in Quixadá, Ceará state. They competed in the Série C once.

History
The club was founded on September October 27, 1965. They won the Campeonato Cearense Second Level in 1967. Quixadá competed in the Série C in 1997, when they were eliminated in the Second Stage of the competition.

Achievements
 Campeonato Cearense Second Level:
 Winners (1): 1967

Stadium
Quixadá Futebol Clube play their home games at Estádio José Antônio Abílio de Lima, nicknamed Abilhão and Estádio dos Imigrantes. The stadium has a maximum capacity of 5,000 people.

References

Association football clubs established in 1965
Football clubs in Ceará
1965 establishments in Brazil